The following lists events that happened in 2015 in Syria.

Incumbents
 President: Bashar    al-Assad
 Prime Minister: Wael Nader al-Halqi

Events
For events related to the Civil War, see Timeline of the Syrian Civil War (January–July 2015) and Timeline of the Syrian Civil War (August–December 2015)

Deaths
Estimates of the total number of deaths in the Syrian Civil War, by opposition activist groups, vary between 494,438 and about 606,000 as of June 2021. On 23 April 2016, the United Nations and Arab League Envoy to Syria put out an estimate of 400,000 that had died in the war.

References

 
2010s in Syria
Years of the 21st century in Syria
Syria
Syria